Jim Hanvey, Detective is a 1937 American film directed by Phil Rosen. It is loosely based on the short story collection of the same name by novelist Octavus Roy Cohen.

Plot summary

Cast 
Guy Kibbee as James Woolford "Jim" Hanvey
Tom Brown as Don Terry
Lucie Kaye as Joan Frost
Catherine Doucet as Adelaide Frost
Edward Gargan as O. R.Smith
Edward Brophy as Romo
Helen Jerome Eddy as Mrs. Tom Ellis
Theodore von Eltz as Dunn
Kenneth Thomson as W. B. Elwood
Howard C. Hickman as Herbert Frost
Oscar Apfel as Lambert
Wade Boteler as Davis
Robert Emmett Keane as Editor
Robert Homans as Sheriff Garrett
Harry Tyler as Taxi Driver
Frank Darien as Pete
Charles Williams as Brackett

Soundtrack

External links 

1937 films
American mystery films
American black-and-white films
Republic Pictures films
Films directed by Phil Rosen
1937 mystery films
1930s English-language films
1930s American films